Cytokine receptor-like factor 1 is a protein that in humans is encoded by the CRLF1 gene.

Function 

This gene encodes a member of the cytokine type I receptor family. The protein forms a secreted complex with cardiotrophin-like cytokine factor 1 and acts on cells expressing ciliary neurotrophic factor receptors. The complex can promote survival of neuronal cells.

Clinical significance

Mutations in this gene are associated with two conditions, both rare:
Cold-induced sweating syndrome, characterized by profuse hyperhidrosis in cold environmental temperature and characteristic craniofacial and skeletal features)
Crisponi syndrome (CS), characterized by neonatal-onset paroxysmal muscular contractions, abnormal function of the autonomic nervous system and craniofacial and skeletal manifestations such as thick and arched eyebrows, a short nose with anteverted nostrils, full cheeks, an inverted upper lip and a small mouth.
It is unknown whether the two conditions are distinct clinical entities or a single clinical entity with variable expressions.
Other characteristic features in CRLF1 mutation include marfanoid habitus with progressive kyphoscoliosis and craniofacial characteristics including dolichocephaly, a slender face with poor expression, a nose with hypoplastic nares, malar hypoplasia and prognathism.

References

Further reading

External links
  GeneReviews/NCBI/NIH/UW entry on Cold-Induced Sweating Syndrome including Crisponi Syndrome
  OMIM enries on Cold-Induced Sweating Syndrome including Crisponi Syndrome